Zir or ZIR may refer to:
Zizers or Zir, a municipality in Switzerland
Zirnitra or Zir, a black dragon in Wendish mythology
Zero Input Response, a type of response in electrical circuit theory
Zir or DOCK-C, a type of DOCK protein
Zir, a proposed English gender-neutral pronoun